The ESCIS or East Sussex Community Information Service is a computer database of local and community information developed and managed by the Library and Information Services of East Sussex County Council in association with Brighton and Hove Library Service. It is a free resource for everyone. It is free to be listed and free to use.

Locations
ESCIS can be accessed for free in every library in East Sussex and Brighton and Hove and anywhere else with Internet Access.

Content
ESCIS holds information about 7820 organisations based in East Sussex and Brighton and Hove. The sorts of organisations included are:

Information and advice 
Voluntary welfare and health 
Support groups 
Business advice 
Trade and professional bodies 
Places of worship 
Charities 
Youth clubs 
Mother and toddler groups 
Clubs and societies 
Environmental groups 
Sports clubs and facilities 
Places to visit 
Local authorities 
Political parties 
The name of an organisation, contact details (name, address, telephone and fax numbers, email and website addresses), general information about what the organisation does, the geographical area covered by the organisation and details of access for people with disabilities are recorded. Links to multimap to show where the service is located.

The ESCIS database may be easily searched to find out about a particular organisation, or to find a number of organisations working in a particular field or geographic area.

Inclusions
Entries can be entered or edited online. See the How to add and How to edit sections for instructions.

Or ask the ESCIS Team for an entry form and then simply complete the details and return it to us by post or e-mail. Forms are also available in libraries.  
You or your organisation will then receive a letter or an email each year to check that your details are correct. Please keep the ESCIS Team informed if your details should change in the meantime.

ESCIS is constantly updated. Each entry indicates when the details were last updated. No entry should be older than 18 months.

References

External links

Organisations based in East Sussex